British Railways 10800 was a diesel locomotive built by the North British Locomotive Company for British Railways in 1950. It had been ordered by the London, Midland and Scottish Railway in 1946 but did not appear until after the 1948 nationalisation of the railways.

The locomotive was designed by George Ivatt as a possible replacement for steam locomotives on secondary and branch lines. The single-cab layout (long bonnet forward) gave the driver a poor view of the road ahead. However, the driver's view was no worse than that from a steam locomotive cab, so it would have been acceptable at the time.

During its brief time on the Southern Region between 1952 and 1954, 10800 gained the nickname 'The Wonder Engine', from the locomotive department's daily query, 'I wonder if it will go today'.

Description
Due to having been ordered by the LMS before the creation of British Railways (BR), 10800 became the first BR mixed-traffic diesel-electric locomotive when it was delivered in 1950. It was successful enough in operation for BR to order two classes of 54 similar locomotives in 1955 although these classes, destined to become the British Rail Class 15 and British Rail Class 16, used the improved YHXL engine.

Extra Information
Bogie wheelbase: 
Bogie pivot centres: 
Sanding equipment: Pneumatic
Heating type: Steam (Water-tube boiler) (Clarkson thimble tube boiler)
Main generator type: BTH
Aux generator type: BTH
Gear ratio: 66:15
Boiler water capacity: 
Boiler fuel capacity:*

Rebuilding as an AC transmission prototype 
In 1961 No. 10800 was bought by Brush Traction and rebuilt for experiments in AC power transmission. Brush named the locomotive Hawk. DC transmission in diesel-electric locomotives was reaching its limits, at least for single-generator locomotives. The brushgear and commutator of a DC generator became prone to flashover for engine powers greater than around 2,700 bhp. The most straightforward solution, rather than redesigning the DC generator, was to adopt an AC alternator instead, which could use a much simpler slipring connection to its field rotor rather than a commutator.

Although the advantages of AC transmission were obvious, the best means to implement suitable traction motors was not. Should these be the familiar DC motors (requiring AC–DC rectification)? Or should AC traction motors be developed, and if so, how would their speed be controlled? High-power solid-state electronics was in an early state at this time, although Brush were keen to become leaders in the field.

A more powerful engine would be required, to give a realistic trial, and Brush already had a suitable one on hand, as a spare from the development of Falcon. This was a Maybach MD655 of 1,400 bhp. The Maybach was also a high-speed diesel engine, running at 1,500 rpm rather than the Paxman's 1,250 rpm. The Paxman was itself considered a high-speed engine, running significantly faster than the English Electric or Sulzer medium-speed (< 1,000 rpm) engines which had been adopted for high-powered British Railways locomotives. The output was at 1,325V / 600A. New AC traction motors were used, with squirrel cage motors supplied by thyristor variable-frequency drives.

Brush's experience with AC transmission, gained with Hawk, would be put to use a few years later with the development of the 4,000 bhp single-engined AC transmission HS4000 Kestrel.

Hawk was used until 1968, after which its control equipment was becoming irrelevantly obsolete and was superseded by the direct experience from Kestrel. During the 1972 miners' strike the engine and generator were removed as a standby generator for the Brush Falcon works. After this, parts began to be stripped until it was finally scrapped around 1976.

References

Further reading

External links

The Railway Raptors

 10800
NBL locomotives
Brush Traction locomotives
Railway locomotives introduced in 1950
Scrapped locomotives
Unique locomotives
Bo-Bo locomotives
Standard gauge locomotives of Great Britain
Diesel-electric locomotives of Great Britain
Individual locomotives of Great Britain